Hans Modrow (27 January 1928 – 10 February 2023) was a German politician best known as the last communist premier of East Germany.

Taking office in the middle of the Peaceful Revolution, he was the de facto leader of the country for much of the winter of 1989 and 1990. He was a transitional figure, paving the way to the first and only free elections in East Germany and including many opposition politicians in his cabinet. 

After the end of Communist rule and reunification of Germany, he was convicted of electoral fraud and perjury by the Dresden District Court in 1995, on the basis that he had been the SED official nominally in charge of the electoral process. He was later convicted of the first charge and was given a nine-month suspended sentence. One of the few high-ranking former SED officials to not have been expelled, he was the honorary chairman of the Party of Democratic Socialism (PDS) and was the president of the "council of elders" of the Left Party from 2007.

Early life and education
Modrow was born on 27 January 1928 in Jasenitz, Province of Pomerania, German Reich, now Jasienica, part of the town of Police in Poland. As a child he was a Hitler Youth leader and attended a Volksschule. He trained as a machinist from 1942 to 1945 when he was filled with intense hatred of the Bolsheviks, whom he deemed as subhumans, inferior to Germans physically and morally. For six months during the Allied bombing of Stettin he served as a volunteer firefighter. He later served briefly in the Volkssturm in January 1945, and was subsequently captured as a prisoner of war by the Soviet Red Army in Stralsund in May 1945. He and other German prisoners were sent to a farm in Hinterpommern to work. Upon arrival, his backpack was stolen, making him begin to rethink the Germans' so-called camaraderie. Days later, he was appointed a driver to a Soviet captain, who asked him about Heinrich Heine, a German poet. Modrow had never heard of him and felt embarrassed that the people he thought of as "subhumans" knew more about German culture than he. Transported to a POW camp near Moscow, he joined a National Committee for a Free Germany anti-fascist school run by future SED Politburo member Alfred Neumann for Wehrmacht members and received training in Marxism-Leninism, which he embraced. Upon release in 1949 he worked as a machinist for LEW Hennigsdorf. That same year he joined the Socialist Unity Party (SED).

From 1949 to 1961, Modrow worked in various functions for the Free German Youth (FDJ) in Brandenburg, Mecklenburg, and Berlin and in 1952 and 1953 studied at the Komsomol college in Moscow. In 1953, he attended the state funeral of Joseph Stalin. After Nikita Khrushchev's Secret Speech at the 20th Party Congress condemning Stalin and beginning de-Stalinization, Modrow claimed to have complained to his former teacher Neumann "Comrade, this is unacceptable — you are accusing us of having learned Stalin off by heart, but I never had the inclination to do this myself, you asked us to!" From 1953 to 1961, he served as an FDJ functionary in East Berlin. From 1954 to 1957, he studied at the SED's Karl Marx school in Berlin, graduating as a social scientist. In 1959 to 1961 he studied at the University of Economics in Berlin-Karlshorst and obtained the degree of graduate economist. He gained his doctorate at the Humboldt University of Berlin in 1966. West Germany's Federal Intelligence Service (BND) kept Modrow under observation from 1958 to 2013.

Communist party career
Modrow had a long political career in East Germany, serving as a member of the Volkskammer from 1957 to 1990 and in the SED's Central Committee (ZK) from 1967 to 1989, having previously been a candidate for the ZK from 1958 to 1967. From 1961 to 1967 he was first secretary of the district administration of the SED in Berlin-Köpenick and secretary for agitation and propaganda from 1967 to 1971 in the SED's district leadership in Berlin. During this time he was involved in the formation of the Union Berlin football club, which is based in the Köpenick district. From 1971 to 1973 he worked as the head of the SED's department of agitation. In 1975 he was awarded the GDR's Patriotic Order of Merit in gold and received the award of the Order of Karl Marx in 1978.

From 1973 onward, he was the SED's first secretary in Dresden, East Germany's third-largest city. He was prevented from rising any further than a local party boss, largely because he was one of the few SED leaders who dared to publicly criticise longtime SED chief Erich Honecker. He developed some important contacts with the Soviet Union, including eventual Soviet leader Mikhail Gorbachev. Modrow initially supported Gorbachev's glasnost and perestroika reforms. In early 1987, Gorbachev and the KGB explored the possibility of installing Modrow as Honecker's successor. From 1988 to 1989, the Stasi, under the orders of Honecker and Erich Mielke, conducted a massive surveillance operation against Modrow with the intention of gathering enough evidence to convict him of high treason.

Peaceful Revolution and premiership
During the Peaceful Revolution of 1989, Modrow ordered thousands of Volkspolizei, Stasi, Combat Groups of the Working Class, and National People's Army troops to crush a demonstration at the Dresden Hauptbahnhof on 4–5 October. Some 1,300 people were arrested. In a top secret and encrypted telex to Honecker on 9 October, Modrow reported: "With the determined commitment of the comrades of the security organs, anti-state terrorist riots were suppressed".

When Honecker was toppled on 18 October, Gorbachev hoped that Modrow would become the new leader of the SED. Egon Krenz was selected instead. He became premier following the resignation of Willi Stoph on 13 November, four days after the Berlin Wall fell. The SED formally abandoned power on 1 December. Krenz resigned two days later, on 3 December. Since the premiership was the highest state post in East Germany, Modrow became the de facto leader of the country.

To defeat the opposition's demand for the complete dissolution of the Stasi, it was renamed as the "Office for National Security" (Amt für Nationale Sicherheit – AfNS) on 17 November 1989. Modrow's attempt to re-brand it further as the "Office for the Protection of the Constitution of the GDR" (Verfassungsschutz der DDR) failed due to pressure from the public and the opposition parties and the AfNS was dissolved on 13 January 1990. The Modrow government gave orders to destroy incriminating Stasi files.

On 7 December 1989, Modrow accepted the proposal of the East German Round Table opposition groups to hold free elections within six months. Modrow and the Round Table agreed on 28 January to bring the elections forward to 18 March. By this time, the SED had added "Party of Democratic Socialism" to its name; the SED portion was dropped altogether in February. Some of the Round Table parties strove for a "third way" model of democratic socialism and therefore agreed with Modrow to slow down or block a reunification with capitalist West Germany. As the SED-PDS regime grew weaker, Modrow on 1 February 1990 proposed a slow, three-stage process that would create a neutral German confederation and continued to oppose "rapid" reunification. The collapse of the East German state and economy in early 1990 and the approaching East German free elections allowed Helmut Kohl's government in Bonn to disregard Modrow's demand for neutrality. 

From 5 February 1990 on, Modrow included eight representatives of opposition parties and civil liberties groups as ministers without portfolio in his cabinet. On 13 February 1990, Modrow met with West German Chancellor Helmut Kohl, asking for an accommodation loan of 15 billion DM, which was rejected by Kohl. Modrow remained premier until the 18 March 1990 elections. The PDS expelled Honecker, Krenz, and other Communist-era leaders in February 1990.

Criminal sentence

On 27 May 1993, the Dresden District Court found Modrow guilty of electoral fraud committed in the Dresden municipal elections in May 1989, specifically, understating the percentage of voters who refused to vote for the official slate. He admitted the charge, but argued that the trial was politically motivated and that the court lacked jurisdiction for crimes committed in East Germany. The judge declined to impose a prison sentence or a fine. The Dresden District Court revoked the decision in August 1995 and Modrow was sentenced to nine months on probation.

Later life and death
After German reunification, Modrow served as a member of the Bundestag (1990–1994) and of the European Parliament (1999–2004). After leaving office, he wrote a number of books on his political experiences, his continued Marxist political views, and his disappointment at the dissolution of the Eastern Bloc. Although a supporter of Gorbachev's reforms in the 1980s, after the fall of Communism he criticised them for weakening the Eastern Bloc's economy. In 2006, he blamed West Germany for the East Germans killed by the communist regime at the Berlin Wall, and later defended the construction of the wall as a necessary measure to prevent World War III. He also called East Germany an "effective democracy". He was criticised for maintaining contacts with Neo-Stalinist groups. In 2018, he sued the Federal Intelligence Service for access to West German intelligence files on him from the Cold War. In 2019 he criticised the enlargement of NATO, which he also opposed reunified Germany's membership in. Modrow died on 10 February 2023, aged 95. He was buried at Dorotheenstadt Cemetery.

Citations

References

 

1928 births
2023 deaths
People from Police, West Pomeranian Voivodeship
People from the Province of Pomerania
Members of the Politburo of the Central Committee of the Socialist Unity Party of Germany
Party of Democratic Socialism (Germany) politicians
The Left (Germany) politicians
Prime Ministers of East Germany
Members of the 2nd Volkskammer
Members of the 3rd Volkskammer
Members of the 4th Volkskammer
Members of the 5th Volkskammer
Members of the 6th Volkskammer
Members of the 7th Volkskammer
Members of the 8th Volkskammer
Members of the 9th Volkskammer
Members of the 10th Volkskammer
Members of the Bundestag for Mecklenburg-Western Pomerania
Members of the Bundestag 1990–1994
Members of the Landtag of Mecklenburg-Western Pomerania
The Left (Germany) MEPs
MEPs for Germany 1999–2004
Free German Youth members
Volkssturm personnel
German prisoners of war in World War II held by the Soviet Union
German politicians convicted of crimes
Recipients of the Patriotic Order of Merit in gold
Recipients of the Banner of Labor
Members of the Bundestag for the Party of Democratic Socialism (Germany)
Child soldiers in World War II
Burials at the Dorotheenstadt Cemetery